Theodwin, also known in the forms Dietwin and Theoduinus, is a name. It might refer to:

 Theodwin of Lobbes, an 8th-century abbot
 Theodwin of Liège, an 11th-century bishop
 Theodwin of Santa Rufina, a 12th-century cardinal

Human name disambiguation pages